A science slam is a scientific talk where scientists present their own scientific research work in a given time frame - usually 10 minutes - in front of a non-expert audience. The focus lies on teaching current science to a diverse audience in an entertaining way. The presentation is judged by the audience. A science slam is a form of science communication.

Variants 
Science slams are open to all fields of science. However, events specializing on particular topics exist as well. Examples include: technical science slams, health science slams,
sociological science slams, 
junior science slams, kid's science slams, and
binational science slams.

References

External links 
 scienceslam.org
 scienceslam.ch

Competition
Science education